There have been many tsunamis involving the territory that is now Indonesia.

List 

{class="wikitable sortable"
+List of significant tsunamis in Indonesia
!Event
!Date
!Location
!class="unsortable"Summary
!class="unsortable"Notes
-
1797 Sumatra earthquake

Padang
Tsunami localized to Padang, Sumatra, Indonesia

-
1833 Sumatra earthquake

Sumatra
Tsunami along the southwest coast of Sumatra

-
1861 Sumatra earthquake

Sumatra
Tsunami along the northwest coast of Sumatra

-
1883 eruption of Krakatoa

Krakatoa
Collapse of Krakatoa caused tsunami sweeping over neighbouring islands and onto Sumatra and Java

-
2004 Indian Ocean earthquake and tsunami

Aceh
Large earthquake near Aceh, Sumatra, Indonesia causing a transoceanic tsunami
One of the deadliest natural disasters in recorded history, with a death toll of over 200,000
-
2010 Mentawai earthquake and tsunami

Mentawai Islands
Tsunami swept the coastal areas of the Mentawai Islands, off the west coast of Sumatra

-
2018 Sulawesi earthquake and tsunami

Palu
Large earthquake near Donggala caused a tsunami that funneled into a bay rising high at Palu, Sulawesi, Indonesia

-
2018 Sunda Strait tsunami

Banten - Lampung
Eruption of the Anak Krakatau volcano in the Sunda Strait caused a tsunami and landslide

}

See also
 List of disasters in Indonesia
 List of tsunamis

Tsunamis